The 1999 All-Pro Team is composed of the National Football League players that were named to the Associated Press, Pro Football Writers Association, and The Sporting News All-Pro Teams in 1999. Both first and second teams are listed for the AP team. These are the three teams that are included in Total Football II: The Official Encyclopedia of the National Football League. In 1999 the Pro Football Writers Association and Pro Football Weekly combined their All-pro teams, a practice with continues through 2008.

Teams

Key
 AP = Associated Press first-team All-Pro
 AP-2 = Associated Press second-team All-Pro
 AP-2t = Tied for second-team All-Pro in the AP vote
 PFWA = Pro Football Writers Association All-NFL
 TSN = The Sporting News All-Pro

References
Pro-Football-Reference.com

All-Pro Teams
Allpro